The Chandeleur Island Light was a lighthouse established in 1848 near the northern end of the Chandeleur Islands in the Gulf of Mexico, off the east coast of Louisiana. Hurricane Katrina destroyed the light in 2005.

History
The tower and the keeper's house were destroyed by a hurricane in August 1852.

By 1865 it had a 4th order Fresnel lens. This tower was the only building on the site that survived the hurricane of October 1, 1893, but it was badly damaged and was taken down. Congress appropriated $35,000 for its replacement.

A new, iron skeleton tower with a 3rd order Fresnel lens (focal plane ) was erected in its place in 1895.  
The light figured in a case before the United States Supreme Court. After a barge carrying fertilizer ran aground, it was determined that the Coast Guard had been negligent in maintaining the proper operation of the light. The Court held that the United States was liable. The light was added to the National Register of Historic Places in 1986 as Chandeleur Light.

Erosion eventually left the tower standing alone in the water, with the last auxiliary building, a keeper's house, destroyed by Hurricane Camille in 1969. The tower was utterly destroyed by Hurricane Katrina in 2005, so that a visit by a research vessel the following spring found no trace of it.

Gallery

References

External links

Lighthouses completed in 1848
Lighthouses completed in 1896
Lighthouses on the National Register of Historic Places in Louisiana
Buildings and structures in St. Bernard Parish, Louisiana
Effects of Hurricane Katrina
Buildings and structures demolished in 2005
National Register of Historic Places in St. Bernard Parish, Louisiana